Wang San-ak (왕산악, 王山岳, ?-?) was the prime minister of Goguryeo during the reign of King Yangwon (6th century AD).

According to the Samguk Sagi, written in 1145, the geomungo was invented by him by using the form of the ancient Chinese instrument guqin (also called chilhyeongeum, literally "seven-string zither"). After his death, the instrument was passed down to Ok Bogo, Son Myeong-deuk, Gwi Geum, An Jang, Cheong Jang, and Geuk Jong, while being widely spread over the kingdom.

See also 
 Three Kingdoms of Korea
 Goguryeo

Sources 
 Samguk Sagi, Vol 32, Goguryeo Bon-Gi

Goguryeo
Korean musicians
6th-century heads of government
Goguryeo people